Hariss bin Harun (born 19 November 1990) is a Singaporean professional footballer who plays as a defender and captains both Singapore Premier League club Lion City Sailors and the Singapore national team. He is Singapore's youngest debutant, making his first international appearance at the age of 16 and 217 days.

Hariss is known for being a versatile player with combative and play-making abilities. Predominantly a centre-back, Hariss has played as a central midfielder, right-back, or as an attacking midfielder. He is recognised for his leadership skills and is the former captain and vice-captain of Young Lions and LionsXII respectively.

Club career

Young Lions 

Hariss began his career along with Young Lions in the S.League in 2007. He became the youngest S-League player in 2007, aged 16 years 3 months and 18 days. The Football Association of Singapore had granted Hariss special dispensation from a rule that allowed players only of 18 years and above to play.

In August 2007, he was Singapore's winner of Nike's 'Who's The Next' contest and secured a training stint at FC Barcelona's famed academy, La Masia. He trained at the Catalans' youth academy for a week, along with 13 other players from six Asia Pacific countries including South Korea and Japan. He captained the players in three friendly games against players from FC Barcelona's youth academy. Hariss impressed the trainers and returning a week later with the MVP award.

2008 proved to be a difficult year for Hariss as he tore his ligaments in a league match against Super Reds on 26 May when Oh Ddog Yi fell on his right knee. The injury ruled him out for a year, causing him to miss the rest of Singapore's World Cup qualifying campaign as well as the 2008 ASEAN Football Championship.

With the help of the Football Association of Singapore and the national team coach Raddy Avramovic, Hariss underwent a 10-day trial with Chinese Super League side Shanghai Shenhua in July 2010, but was ultimately not offered a contract.

Injury would strike Hariss again in 2010, when he suffered a right leg fracture in a match against India at the 2010 Asian Games on 11 November 2010. The duration of six weeks that Hariss required for the recovery of his fracture eventually meant that he missed out on a second consecutive ASEAN Football Championship.

Hariss' performances were recognized with the S.League Young Player of the Year award in 2010.

LionsXII 

In December 2011, Hariss was called up to join LionsXII to compete in the 2012 Malaysia Super League. He made his LionsXII debut in a league match against Kelantan in January 2012. His first goal came on the 19th minute against Sabah on 21 January. Hariss' goalscoring form against Sabah would continue when the stand-in captain scored his first career hat-trick in a record 9–0 win on 16 June. He scored with a volley three minutes after Agu Casmir's 19th-minute opener and added a second in the 41st minute. He completed his hat-trick with a Shaiful Esah assist on 73 minutes only. Hariss made 34 appearances and scored 5 goals in all competitions as LionsXII finished runners-up in their first season back in Malaysian football.

Hariss missed the start of the 2013 season following a broken right fibula sustained in the 2012 ASEAN Football Championship match against Indonesia. He made his return as a 20th-minute substitute in a 3–0 Super League win over Pahang on 16 February. His first goal of the season came three days later four minutes into a 2–2 draw with Johor Darul Ta'zim. Hariss played a pivotal role for the club as LionsXII capped the successful 2013 season as eventual champions of the Malaysia Super League with an unbeaten home record.

In July 2013, Hariss Harun rejected the offer of a contract from the Portuguese Primeira Liga side, Rio Ave. National Service commitments and salary issues were speculated as reasons why the deal broke down, despite the help of Singapore billionaire Peter Lim and agent Jorge Mendes. Mendes had been negotiating with clubs for one year for Hariss to further his career in Europe. Had Hariss moved abroad, Hariss would have followed the likes of former Singaporean internationals Fandi Ahmad and V. Sundramoorthy in playing for European clubs.

Johor Darul Ta'zim 

Following Hariss' decision not to join Rio Ave, Malaysia Super League side Johor Darul Ta'zim moved quickly to confirm his signing in a two-year deal worth over US$20,000 (S$25,000) per month in November 2013. On 11 February, Hariss scored his first goal for the club against Kedah in a Malaysia FA Cup match. 4 days later, Hariss scored his first league goal for the club in a Super League match against Selangor. In his first season, Hariss helped Johor win their first Malaysian Super League title. On 31 October 2015, he helped Johor Darul Ta'zim win the 2015 Malaysia Super League and their first 2015 AFC Cup Final against FC Istiklol in Tajikistan. On 9 November 2015, Hariss signed a new 2-year contract with the club, with a monthly salary of US$30,000 (S$43,000), making him the highest paid Singaporean footballer in history. He scored a header from a corner on the opening match day of the 2016 Malaysia Super League against Selangor FA which ended 1–1 with Johor Darul Ta'zim winning the 2016 Sultan Haji Ahmad Shah Cup on penalties (7–6).

CE L'Hospitalet
Hariss was to join CE L'Hospitalet on a one-year loan deal, becoming the first-ever Singaporean to play in the Spanish leagues. The move was cancelled 2 weeks after Hariss arrived in Spain due to a taxation problem for the Spanish side, resulting in them being unable to register new players. Hariss was left in the limbo as his parent club, JDT, had all their foreign players slots filled. Hariss returned to the S.League with JDT adamant that the move to CE L'Hospitalet will still go through in June.

Home United
Hariss returned to Singapore to join Home United on a 3-month loan deal. He made his debut for The Protectors on 1 April in a top of the table clash against Albirex Niigata (S) in a 2–2 draw.

Return to Johor Darul Ta'zim
Hariss returned to Johor in 2018 after his loan contract at Home United ended. He made his return on 3 February against Kedah FA in the 2018 Piala Sumbangsih, in which Johor won their 3rd Piala Sumbangsih. He scored his first goal of the season in a 2–1 victory against Perak FA, which also sealed Johor's 5th consecutive league title. On 30 April 2021, Hariss scored the equalizer for his side in a 1–1 draw against Kuala Lumpur FC. JDT and Hariss have mutually terminated the contract on 10 May 2021 in respect of Hariss' decision to return to Singapore due to family matters as the COVID-19 pandemic has made it impossible to travel back home on a more regular basis.

Lion City Sailors
Hariss signed for Lion City Sailors on a three-and-a-half-year contract on 10 May 2021.

International career

Youth 

Hariss has been capped at all youth levels with the Singapore national football team. He was part of the Singapore national under-23 football team that won the bronze medal at the 2007, 2009 and 2013 Southeast Asian Games.

Senior 

Hariss was scouted by then-national team coach Raddy Avramovic who gave him his international debut in a friendly against North Korea on 24 June 2007 when he came on as a 70th-minute substitute. He is the youngest ever player to play for the Singapore national team at the age of 16 years and 217 days, breaking the previous record held by Singapore legend Fandi Ahmad who debuted at 17 years, 3 months and 23 days. Avramovic rated Hariss as an "exceptional player" in a 2012 Straits Times interview.

Hariss was called up to the Singapore squad for the 2012 ASEAN Football Championship. A shin fracture in a group stage loss to Indonesia ruled him out for the rest of the tournament as Singapore won the competition. He had also missed out on the 2008 and 2010 editions of the competition due to injury.

Hariss scored his first senior international goal in the 27th minute of a friendly match against Laos on 7 June 2013.

Along with Zulfahmi Arifin, he has been identified by national team coach Bernd Stange as the future of Singapore's midfield. Stange also assessed that he is capable of playing for a "top European club" and in a strong league like the Bundesliga.

On 24 July 2010, Hariss was drafted into the Singapore Selection XI squad that was to play against Burnley. He captained the side for the fixture, with the match eventually ending in a 1–0 defeat. On 16 June 2015, Hariss was afforded the chance to captain the national team in a match against Japan. Supposedly a predictable victory for the Japanese team, the match subsequently ended in a shocking 0–0 draw.

Hariss scored his 7th international goal in a 2–0 friendly victory over Fiji, helping new head coach Fandi Ahmad to his first win.

On 14 November 2019, Hariss made his 100th cap for the national team against Qatar, making him the 13th footballer to have 100 appearances for the national team.

In May 2021, Hariss pulled out of the Singapore team before Singapore's World Cup qualifying match against Saudi Arabia due to personal reasons.

On 7 November 2021, Hariss tested positive for COVID-19, just one day before the national team is flew to Dubai for a training camp in preparation for the 2020 AFF Championship. He is then placed under isolation and did not join the team in Dubai.

Others

Singapore Selection Squad
He was selected as part of the Singapore Selection squad for The Sultan of Selangor's Cup to be held on 6 May 2017.

Personal life 

Hariss received his primary education at St. Michael's Primary School and secondary education at St. Gabriel's Secondary School. He graduated with a diploma in Sport & Wellness Management from Nanyang Polytechnic.

Born to Singaporean Indian parents of Malayali Muslim origin, a logistics officer, Harun bin Habib Mohamed and a Housewife, Nisha binte Mohamed Yusoff. His father is his football advisor. He credits his father and uncle for starting his interest in football since the age of 6.

On 9 March 2014, Hariss married his girlfriend Syahirah Mohamad in a function hall opposite Jalan Besar Stadium, home ground of LionsXII. They had been dating for over two years and were engaged in February 2013.

Hariss is featured in eFootball Pro Evolution Soccer 2020 alongside his Singapore teammate Baihakki Khaizan. He will be the second Singaporean to be featured in a video game after Safuwan Baharudin.

Career statistics

Club 
 Updated 5 November 2022

( – ) indicates unavailable referenced data conforming to reliable sources guidelines.

 Young Lions and LionsXII are ineligible for qualification to AFC competitions in their respective leagues.
 Young Lions withdrew from the Singapore Cup and Singapore League Cup in 2011 due to scheduled participation in the 2011 AFF U-23 Youth Championship.

International goals
Scores and results list Singapore's goal tally first.

Honours 

LionsXII
Malaysia Super League: 2013

Johor Darul Ta'zim
AFC Cup: 2015
Malaysia Cup: 2019
Malaysia Super League: 2014, 2015, 2016, 2018, 2019, 2020
Malaysia FA Cup: 2016
Malaysian Charity Shield: 2015, 2016, 2018, 2019, 2020

Lion City Sailors
Singapore Premier League: 2021

Singapore
AFF Championship: 2012
Southeast Asian Games: bronze medal 2007, 2009, 2013

Individual
S.League Young Player of the Year: 2010
 2016 AFF Championship: Best Eleven
 ASEAN Football Federation Best XI: 2016

See also
 List of men's footballers with 100 or more international caps

References 

1990 births
Living people
Singaporean Muslims
Expatriate footballers in Malaysia
LionsXII players
Johor Darul Ta'zim F.C. players
Malaysia Super League players
Singapore international footballers
Singaporean footballers
Singaporean expatriate footballers
Singaporean people of Indian descent
Association football central defenders
Association football midfielders
CE L'Hospitalet players
Young Lions FC players
Footballers at the 2006 Asian Games
Footballers at the 2010 Asian Games
Southeast Asian Games bronze medalists for Singapore
Southeast Asian Games medalists in football
Competitors at the 2007 Southeast Asian Games
Competitors at the 2009 Southeast Asian Games
Competitors at the 2013 Southeast Asian Games
Asian Games competitors for Singapore
AFC Cup winning players
FIFA Century Club